Rajshahi Government City College is a government-owned higher secondary educational institution located in Rajshahi. It offers higher secondary, undergraduate and graduate programs, affiliated with National University, Bangladesh. It was established in 1958 and nationalized in 1982.

History 

After the partition of India, the people of the Rajshahi region suffered from higher education. Because, then, only two institutions, Rajshahi College and a non-government college called Adina Fazlul Haque College were for giving higher education to the people. So, establishing a college was an immediate desire of the people of that region. Thus, with help of local people and the administration of Rajshahi, this college was established in July 1958.

In its initial years, there was no land or building for the college. So, the academic activities are taken in Loknath high school with only 140 students. But, in 1969, the number of students of the institution was 3500. In 1958, 0.50 acres of land were bought for 18000 BDT for the college in Rajshahi city. The first principal of this college was Mohammad Abdul Karim. After some days, he died. Then, Shamshuddin Ahmed was selected as the second principal of that college.

The college nationalized in 1982. In 1999, 400 books were bought for 3075 BDT for creating a college library.

Principal 
The acting principal of the institution is Amina Abedin. The vice-principal is A. No. M. Al Mamun Chowdhury.

HSC Admission 
HSC admission is done on the basis of the results of SSC or equivalent examination of the student. The merit order has to be determined on the basis of the total number obtained. Here 12000 students are admitted every year in three departments. 

 Science (600 seats) 
 Arts (300 seats) and
 Commerce (300 seats)

Faculties and Departments 
The institution has four faculties.

Faculty of Science 
The faculty comprises the following departments,
 Department of Physics
 Department of Botany
 Department of Zoology
 Department of Mathematics
Department of Chemistry

Faculty of Arts 
The faculty comprises the following departments,
 Department of Philosophy
 Department of Bengali
 Department of English
 Department of Islamic History and Culture

Faculty of Business 
The faculty comprises the following departments:
 Department of Accounting
 Department of Management

Faculty of Social Science 
The faculty comprises the following departments:
 Department of Economics
 Department of Political Science

See also 
 Rajshahi College
 University of Rajshahi

References 

Educational institutions established in 1958
Colleges affiliated to National University, Bangladesh
Colleges in Rajshahi District
Universities and colleges in Rajshahi District
Education in Rajshahi
1958 establishments in East Pakistan